Pseudoedaspis oreiplana is a species of tephritid or fruit flies in the genus Pseudoedaspis of the family Tephritidae.

Distribution
Argentina.

References

Tephritinae
Insects described in 1910
Diptera of South America